Phragmataecia hummeli is a species of moth of the family Cossidae. It is found in China (north-eastern Sichuan).

References

Moths described in 1942
Phragmataecia